In molecular biology, for Homo sapiens snoRA35 (also known as HBI-36) is an H/ACA box snoRNA, first cloned from a mouse adult brain cDNA library by Cavaillé et al. (2000), and found to be specifically expressed in the choroid plexus. Its human orthologue, HBI-36 was discovered by a homology search, and was found to be specifically expressed in the brain. Its gene resides in the second intron of the serotonin receptor 2c (5HT-2c) gene, which is predominantly expressed in choroid plexus epithelial cells. The human 5HT-2c mRNA was predicted to be 2'O-methylated by the C/D box snoRNP HBII-52 at a position also subjected to A:I editing. HBI-36 has no documented RNA target.

References

External links 
 
 

Small nuclear RNA